Agrochemical Football Club (widely known as Agrochemicals) is a Kenyan football club based in Muhoroni.  They are a member of the Kenyan National Super League, the second level in the Kenyan football league system. Their home stadium is the Furaha Academy Sports Ground.

History
The club is owned by the Agrochemical and Food Company Limited.

Agrochemicals played in the Nyanza North Provincial League from 1989 to 1997, when it won promotion to the Nationwide League. In 2005 it was promoted to the Kenyan Premier League.

At the end of the 2009 season Agrochemical was relegated to the FKL Nationwide League.

References 

Association football clubs established in 1989
Kenyan Premier League clubs
Kenyan National Super League clubs
FKF Division One clubs
Football clubs in Kenya
Sport in Nyanza Province
1989 establishments in Kenya
Works association football clubs in Kenya